Heerlen is a railway station located in Heerlen, Netherlands.

History
The station was opened on 1 May 1896 and is located on the Sittard–Herzogenrath railway and the Heerlen–Schin op Geul railway. The station was an important mining station, until the mines closed down.

As part of the Maankwartier ("Moon Quarter") project, construction of an entirely new train station started in December 2012.

Train services

The following train services call at this station:
Express:
Intercity IC 3500: Amsterdam Schiphol – Utrecht – Eindhoven – Heerlen
Sneltrein : Aachen – Heerlen – Maastricht
Local:
Stoptrein : Sittard – Heerlen – Kerkrade
Stoptrein : Maastricht Randwyck – Heerlen

Bus services
The following bus lines serve the bus station north of the railway station:

 20: Heerlen Station–Heerlen South––Voerendaal–Voerendaal Station––Weustenrade–––Wijnandsrade–Laar–Nuth–Vaesrade–Hoensbroek
 21: Brunssum–Hoensbroek–Heerlen Station–Heerlen Hospital–Heerlen South–Kerkrade Stadion–Simpelveld–Eys–Gulpen
 22: Heerlen Hospital–Heerlen Station–Landgraaf–Ubach
 25: Hoensbroek–Heerlen North–Heerlen Station–Landgraaf–Kerkrade
 26: Kerkrade Bus Station–Haanrade–Eygelshoven Markt–Eygelshoven Station–Landgraaf–Heerlen de Kissel Station–Heerlen Station–Hoensbroek
 28: Kerkrade South–Kerkrade Station–Kerkrade Bus Station–GaiaPark (Zoo)–Kerkrade Stadion–Heerlen East–Heerlen Station–Heerlen North–Brunssum–Schinveld
 29: Kerkrade South–Kerkrade Station–Kerkrade Bus Station–Eygelshoven Markt–Landgraaf–Heerlen Station–Heerlen Molenburg–Kerkrade Stadion
 31: Heerlen Station–Beek (School Service)
 33: Heerlen Station–Landgraaf–Ubach
 36: Heerlen Station–Brunssum–Jabeek–Doenrade–Sittard Station
 37: Heerlen Station–Brunssum–Merkelbeek–Doenrade–Sittard Station
 40: Heerlen Station–Kunrade–Ubachsberg–Elkenrade–Wijlre–Gulpen
 41: Kerkrade Bus Station–GaiaPark (Zoo)–Kerkrade Stadion–Heerlen South–Heerlen Station–Hoensbroek–Amstenrade–Oirsbeek–Doenrade–Sittard Station
 42:
 43: Heerlen Station–Kerkrade Stadion–Simpelveld–Bocholtz–Nijswiller–Lemiers–Vaals
 44: Heerlen Station–Kerkrade Stadion– (Germany)–Richterich–Laurensberg–Aachen–Aachen Hauptbahnhof
 52: Heerlen Station–Kunrade–Voerendaal–Klimmen–Hulsberg–Arensgenhout–Schimmert–Ulestraten–Meerssen Station
 58: Heerlen Station–Nijswiller–Wittem–Gulpen

External links
NS website 
Dutch public transport Travel planner 

Railway stations in Heerlen
Railway stations opened in 1896
Railway stations on the Heuvellandlijn